Banagher was a constituency represented in the Irish House of Commons until 1800.

History
Banagher had two members in the 1689 Patriot Parliament summoned by King James II.

Members of Parliament, 1629–1801
1634–1635 Sir Edward Bagshawe and Richard Pigott 
1639–1649 Thomas Little (expelled and replaced by Robert Smith) and Jacob Lovell (died and replaced 1642 by James Laughlyn. Laughlyn died and was replaced 1645 by Sir Robert Dixon)
1661–1666 Colonel Carey Dillon,  later  5th Earl of Roscommon and Sir William Gore, 3rd Baronet

1689–1801

Notes

References

Bibliography

Constituencies of the Parliament of Ireland (pre-1801)
Historic constituencies in County Offaly
1629 establishments in Ireland
1800 disestablishments in Ireland
Constituencies established in 1629
Constituencies disestablished in 1800